International Playhouse is the name of an American television series that was broadcast on the now-defunct DuMont Television Network during 1951.

Broadcast history
International Playhouse is a Monday night filmed series, but the exact dates of broadcast are unclear. Brooks and Marsh (2007) state the program aired from April to May 1951. McNeil (1996) and the Clarke Ingram historic website on DuMont both give the broadcast dates as May 30, 1951, to November 14, 1951. Little information about the series has been preserved. McNeil states the content consisted of "short foreign films and other foreign-made dramatic stories". A TV listing from December 10, 1952, suggests the series continued on WABD after the network run ended; in the listing the show is listed at 10:00PM, with the guide to films on TV for that day suggesting the presentation consisted of 1934 British film Freedom of the Seas.

Episode status
The UCLA Film and Television Archive lists 12 episodes in their collection, some of which are incomplete.

See also
List of programs broadcast by the DuMont Television Network
List of surviving DuMont Television Network broadcasts

References

Bibliography
David Weinstein, The Forgotten Network: DuMont and the Birth of American Television (Philadelphia: Temple University Press, 2004) 
Alex McNeil, Total Television, Fourth edition (New York: Penguin Books, 1980) 
Tim Brooks and Earle Marsh, The Complete Directory to Prime Time Network TV Shows, Third edition (New York: Ballantine Books, 1964)

External links
 
DuMont historical website

1951 American television series debuts
1951 American television series endings
Black-and-white American television shows
DuMont Television Network original programming
English-language television shows
American motion picture television series